The Cathedral of St. John the Evangelist is the episcopal see of the Catholic Archdiocese of Milwaukee in Milwaukee, Wisconsin. The building itself is in German Renaissance Revival style, built in 1847, with changes after several fires. It is listed on the National Register of Historic Places and designated a Milwaukee Landmark. It is located just east of Cathedral Square Park.

Description 
Established in 1837, St. John's parish was the first Roman Catholic congregation in Milwaukee. In early years, the congregation worshiped at St. Peter's church nearby.

Archbishop John Henni purchased land for the cathedral in 1844. The cornerstone was laid on December 5, 1847, after nearly $30,000 was raised for construction. It was completed in 1852 and dedicated to John the Evangelist. The building was designed by architect Victor Schulte in the nineteenth-century Zopfstil (or "pigtail" style) and built using Cream City brick, a distinct light colored brick found locally. Schulte designed two other Milwaukee churches in the same style:  St. Mary's on North Broadway and Holy Trinity at Walker's Point.

The first stage of the three-stage tower (up through the clocks) is Schulte's original design from the 1840s, and it is simpler than the higher stages. Its flat pilasters match those on the dignified lower main block of the church. This is in keeping with the original Zopfstil style, which was a reaction against the fancier Baroque style then popular in much of Europe. A steeple originally rose from that first stage.

After forty years Schulte's original steeple was deemed unsafe and the section above the clock was replaced with a taller tower in 1893, which was designed by noted Milwaukee architects George Ferry & Alfred Clas. The new two-stage tower is in a fancier style, making the whole building look less from the Civil War era.

A fire partially destroyed the church and most of its contents in January 1935. Richard Perrin tells:  "The nave and chancel areas were gutted, precious stained glass windows, mural paintings, as well as a valuable pipe organ, were completely destroyed. The roof caved in and even the outside walls were severely damaged due to the intense heat. Only the tower remained intact. Fire Chief Peter Steinkellner was personally in charge of fighting the fire. When he realized that the church proper could not be saved, he concentrated his efforts on the tower and succeeded in saving it." Rebuilding was completed in time for midnight mass on Christmas Eve of 1942.

St. John's Cathedral features thirteen large hand-cut stained glass windows made by T.C. Esser Company of Milwaukee. A large tomb-shaped baptismal pool and marble font is also situated prominently in the center of the sanctuary. In 2001 a gated garden and atrium were added at the north end of the building.

The Cathedral of St. John the Evangelist celebrated its 150th anniversary in 1997.

Renovation and controversy

The building was rededicated on February 9, 2002, following a controversial renovation project which consisted of some restoration work on the historic structure but also a radical remodeling of the interior. A very vocal anti-renovation group of parishioners petitioned the Vatican for a halt to the renovation. Archbishop Rembert Weakland was the primary advocate of the renovation which he and supporters felt brought the cathedral into a more modern "post-conciliar" style. Weakland hired liturgical consultant Richard S. Vosko to plan the renovation. Among the most controversial elements of the renovation was the dismantling of the historic High Altar and Baldacchino in the apse which were replaced with organ pipes. The sanctuary and altar was then moved forward into the nave and crowned with a fiberglass crucifix designed by Italian sculptors Arnaldo Pomodoro and Giuseppe Maraniell. The piece is topped with a crown of thorns, fourteen feet in diameter, which hovers over the figure of Christ.

See also

List of churches in the Roman Catholic Archdiocese of Milwaukee
List of Catholic cathedrals in the United States
List of cathedrals in the United States

References

External links 

Official Cathedral Site
Archdiocese of Milwaukee Official Site

Churches on the National Register of Historic Places in Wisconsin
Landmarks in Wisconsin
Roman Catholic churches in Milwaukee
Roman Catholic cathedrals in Wisconsin
Roman Catholic churches completed in 1852
19th-century Roman Catholic church buildings in the United States
National Register of Historic Places in Milwaukee
1852 establishments in Wisconsin